The term "K-tag" may refer to:

 K-TAG, a toll collection transponder for the Kansas Turnpike
 K-tag, a recognized colloquial term for a United States Forest Service Location Poster, a rural navigational aid

See also
 Kansas Turnpike
 Electronic toll collection
 United States Forest Service
 Public Land Survey System
 Bearing Tree